Alfredo Sánchez Benito (born 3 December 1972) is a Spanish retired footballer who played as a midfielder, and is the manager of CF Fuenlabrada.

Over ten seasons, he amassed Segunda División totals of 314 matches and 24 goals, with Leganés, Osasuna (which he also represented in La Liga) and Elche.

After retiring, Alfredo worked several years as assistant coach, with Osasuna.

Football career
Alfredo was born in Madrid. Starting in 1993–94, he played his first seven seasons as a professional in Segunda División, with hometown club CD Leganés and CA Osasuna: in the last one he appeared in 37 games and scored four goals, to help the latter return to La Liga after an absence of six years.

Subsequently, Alfredo competed with the Navarrese in the top level, his best year being 2002–03 – 31 matches, 21 starts, 1,910 minutes of action. Released in the summer of 2004, he then was an undisputed starter during three second level campaigns with Elche CF, and he retired at the end of 2007–08 (aged nearly 36) in Segunda División B, where he represented Benidorm CF.

Immediately after retiring, Alfredo re-joined Osasuna, going on to act as assistant coach for several managers. In between those spells, he acted as match scout at Atlético Madrid.

After working as a scout for CF Fuenlabrada for three years, Alfredo became Mere's assistant in July 2022. On 15 February 2023, he became the interim manager after Mere was sacked.

On 28 February 2023, Alfredo was confirmed as manager of Fuenla for the remainder of the season.

References

External links

1972 births
Living people
Footballers from Madrid
Spanish footballers
Association football midfielders
La Liga players
Segunda División players
Segunda División B players
CD Leganés B players
CD Leganés players
CA Osasuna players
Elche CF players
Benidorm CF footballers
Spanish football managers
Primera Federación managers
CF Fuenlabrada managers